Best Director is one of the main category of Shanghai Film Critics Awards.

Winners list

External links
19th Annual Winners List
18th Annual Winners List
17th Annual Winners List
15th Annual Winners List
14th Annual Winners List

Shanghai Film Critics Awards
Awards established in 1994
Awards for best director
1994 establishments in China